Kilowatt is an album by jazz fusion guitarist Kazumi Watanabe, originally released on audio cassette in 1989. In 1991 it was released again on cassette, CD and LP.

Track listing
All tracks by Kazumi Watanabe except where noted.

"1000 Mega" - 4:58
"Capri" - 4:10
"No One" (Watanabe/Brunel) - 5:33
"Jive" (Watanabe/Brunel) - 3:48
"Papyrus" - 4:50
"Sunspin" - 5:15
"Pretty Soon" (Brunel) - 5:37
"Bernard" (Brunel) - 4:42
"Dolphin Dance" (Herbie Hancock) - 6:59
"Good Night Machines" (Watanabe/Moraz/Brunel) - 6:18

Personnel
 Kazumi Watanabe - guitars, synth guitars, keyboards
 Bunny Brunel - bass, synth bass, keyboards
 John Wackerman - drums, synth drums, electric vibes

Additional Musicians
 Wayne Shorter - sax (2, 8)
 Patrick Moraz - keyboards (1, 2, 4, 8, 10)
 Alex Acuna - percussion (2, 3, 4, 5, 7, 8)

References

Notes

1989 albums
Kazumi Watanabe albums
Gramavision Records albums